North Wilkes High School is a public school (grades 9–12) located in Hays, North Carolina. It is a part of the Wilkes County Schools system. The school's enrollment typically runs from 700 to 750 students. The school's district includes most of northern Wilkes County, including the communities of Traphill, Hays, McGrady, Mulberry, and a small portion of the town of North Wilkesboro.

The original school building, built in the 1950s, was demolished in 2006. Several new classroom buildings were built; they are connected with enclosed hallways lined with student lockers. The new school buildings consist of three levels. Only one wing of the old school building remains; it includes the cafeteria.

Athletics
The school mascots are the Vikings; the school's colors are Royal Blue, White, and Red. North Wilkes High School supports varsity teams for the following sports: cheerleading, men's/women's basketball, football, men's baseball, wrestling, women's softball, women's volleyball, men's/women's soccer, men's/women's tennis, cross country, track and field, and swimming.

North Wilkes competes in the Mountain Valley 1A/2A conference. It is listed as a 2A school and competes in North Carolina.

State Championships
 Wrestling 1A/2A Dual State Champions: 1998
 Men's Basketball: 1961

References

External links

School district website

Public high schools in North Carolina
Educational institutions established in 1956
Schools in Wilkes County, North Carolina
1956 establishments in North Carolina